Nasal embryonic luteinizing hormone-releasing hormone factor is a protein that in humans is encoded by the NELF gene.

References

Further reading